Pustelnia may refer to the following places:
Pustelnia, Greater Poland Voivodeship (west-central Poland)
Pustelnia, Kuyavian-Pomeranian Voivodeship (north-central Poland)
Pustelnia, West Pomeranian Voivodeship (north-west Poland)